Lucerne in central Switzerland is the capital of the canton of Lucerne and part of the district of Lucerne. With a population of about 81,057 people, it is the most populous town in Central Switzerland.  Notable people associated with Lucerne include:

Politicians and others 

 Hans Urs von Balthasar (1905-1988), theologian
 Alphons Egli (1924-2016), politician
 Thelma Furness, Viscountess Furness (1904-1970), American socialite
 Felix Gmür (born 1966), theologian and bishop of Basel
 Petermann von Gundoldingen (? -1386), Schultheiss, participant in the battle near Sempach 
 Josef Martin Knüsel (1813-1889), politician and jurist 
 Gloria Morgan-Vanderbilt (1904-1965), American socialite
 Anton Muheim (1916-2016), Social Democrat politician, President of the National Council
 Oswald Myconius (1488-1552), reformer. 
 Franz Riedweg (1907-2005), doctor and SS Obersturmbannführer
 Melchior Russ (c. 1450-1499), historian 
 Anna Maria Rüttimann-Meyer von Schauensee (1772-1856) a politically influential Swiss salonist 
 Josef Anton Schobinger (1849-1911), politician and builder

Arts 
 Peter Bichsel, (born 1935), writer
 Rolf Brem (1926-2014), sculptor, draftsman and graphic artist
 Fritz Brun (1878-1959), composer and conductor
 Heidi Brunner (born 1961), opera singer 
 Caspar Diethelm (1926-1997), composer
 Rolf Dobelli (born 1966), writer and entrepreneur 
 Jolanda Egger (born 1960), actress, beauty queen, model and racing driver 
 Hans Erni (1909-2015), painter, graphic artist and sculptor
 Herbert Ernst Groh (1906-1982), tenor
 Ernst Hodel junior (1881-1955), painter
 Thomas Imbach (born 1962), filmmaker
 Armin Jordan (1932-2006), conductor
 Stephan Klapproth, (born 1958), journalist and television presenter 
 Michael Koch, film director and screenwriter
 Urs Leimgruber (born 1952), saxophonist 
 Edith Mathis (born 1938), soprano and university professor
 Max von Moos (1903-1979), painter and graphic artist
 Mauro Peter (born 1987), opera singer
 Robert Pilchowski (1909-1990), writer
 Carl Spitteler (1845-1924), writer and Nobel laureate (died in Lucerne) 
 Andrea Štaka (born 1973), director and screenwriter
 Emil Steinberger (born 1933), cabaret artist, writer, director and actor
 Fredy Studer (born 1948), drummer
 André Thomkins (1930-1985), painter, draftsman and poet
 Siegfried Wagner (1869-1930), German composer, librettist and conductor
 Robert Wuellner (1885-1966), actor, director and filmproducer
 Luzia von Wyl (born 1985), jazz pianist and composer
 Loredana Zefi (born 1995), rapper
 Robert Zünd (1826-1909), painter

Science and business 

 Markus Breitschmid (born 1966), architectural theorist and architectural historian 
 Johann Baptist Cysat (1585-1657), mathematician and astronomer 
 Edgar Gretener (1902-1958), electrical engineer
 Toni Hagen (1917-2003), geologist
 Josef-Maria Jauch (1914-1974), theoretical physicist
 Peter von Matt, (born 1937), philologist, specialist for German studies, author
 Stanislaus von Moos (born 1940), art historian and architectural theorist
 Michael Pieper (born 1946), billionaire businessman
 Walter von Moos (1918-2016), industrialist

Sport 
 Claudio Castagnoli (born 1980), or more commonly known as Cesaro, professional wrestler 
 Hippolyt Kempf (born 1965), Olympia gold medal winner (Nordic combined) 
 Kurt Müller (born 1948), footballer, 38 caps for Switzerland
 Karl Odermatt (born 1942), footballer, 50 caps for Switzerland
 Lara Stalder (born 1994), ice hockey player

References

Lists of people by city